This is a list of schools in Hampshire, England.

State-funded schools

Primary schools

Abbotswood Junior School, Totton
Abbotts Ann CE Primary School, Abbotts Ann
Alderwood School, Aldershot
All Saints CE Junior School, Fleet
All Saints CE Primary School, Winchester
Alton Infant School, Alton
Alver Valley Infant and Nursery School, Rowner
Alver Valley Junior School, Rowner
Alverstoke CE Junior School, Alverstoke
Alverstoke Community Infant School, Alverstoke
Ampfield CE Primary School, Ampfield
Amport CE Primary School, Amport
Andover CE Primary School, Andover
Andrews' Endowed CE Primary School, Holybourne
Anstey Junior School, Alton
Anton Infant School, Andover
Anton Junior School Andover
Appleshaw St Peter's CE Primary School, Ragged Appleshaw
Ashford Hill Primary School, Ashford Hill
Ashley Infant School, Ashley
Ashley Junior School, Ashley
Awbridge Primary School, Awbridge
Balksbury Infant School, Andover
Balksbury Junior School, Andover
Barncroft Primary School, Havant
Bartley CE Junior School, Bartley
Barton Farm Primary Academy, Winchester
Barton Stacey CE Primary School, Winchester
Beaulieu Village Primary School, Beaulieu
Bedenham Primary School, Gosport
Bentley CE Primary School, Bentley
Berewood Primary School, Waterlooville
Berrywood Primary School, Hedge End
Bidbury Infant School, Bedhampton
Bidbury Junior School, Bedhampton
Binsted CE Primary School, Binsted
Bishop's Waltham Infant School, Bishop's Waltham
Bishop's Waltham Junior School, Bishop's Waltham
Bishopswood Infant School, Tadley
Bishopswood Junior School, Tadley
Blackfield Primary School, Blackfield
Boorley Park Primary School, Botley
Bordon Infant School, Bordon
Bordon Junior School, Bordon
Bosmere Junior School, Havant
Botley CE Primary School, Botley
Braishfield Primary School, Braishfield
Bramley CE Primary School, Bramley
Bransgore CE Primary School, Bransgore
Breamore CE Primary School, Breamore
Brockenhurst CE Primary School, Brockenhurst
Brockhurst Primary School, Gosport
Broughton Primary School, Broughton
Burghclere Primary School, Burghclere
Buriton Primary School, Buriton
Burley Primary School, Burley
Burnham Copse Primary School, Tadley
Bursledon CE Infant School, Bursledon
Bursledon Junior School, Bursledon
Buryfields Infant School, Odiham
The Butts Primary School, Alton
Cadland Primary School, Holbury
Calmore Infant School, Totton and Eling
Calmore Junior School, Totton and Eling
The Cambridge Primary School, Aldershot
Castle Hill Infant School, Basingstoke
Castle Hill Primary School, Basingstoke
Castle Primary School, Portchester
Catherington CE Infant School, Catherington
Chalk Ridge Primary School, Brighton Hill
Chandler's Ford Infant School, Chandler's Ford
Charles Kingsley's CE Primary School, Eversley
Chawton CE Primary School, Chawton
Cherbourg Primary School, Eastleigh
Cheriton Primary School, Cheriton
Cherrywood Community Primary School, Farnborough
Chiltern Primary School, Basingstoke
Church Crookham Junior School, Fleet
Clanfield Junior School, Clanfield
Clatford CE Primary School, Goodworth Clatford
Cliddesden Primary School, Cliddesden
Colden Common Primary School, Colden Common
Compton All Saints' CE Primary School, Compton
Copythorne CE Infant School, Copythorne
Cornerstone CE Primary School, Whiteley
Cove Infant School, Cove
Cove Junior School, Cove
Cranford Park CE Primary School, Yateley
The Crescent Primary School, Eastleigh
Crofton Anne Dale Infant School, Stubbington
Crofton Anne Dale Junior School, Stubbington
Crofton Hammond Infant School, Stubbington
Crofton Hammond Junior School, Stubbington
Crondall Primary School, Crondall
Crookham CE Infant School, Church Crookham
Cupernham Infant School, Romsey
Cupernham Junior School, Romsey
Curdridge Primary School, Curdridge
Denmead Infant School, Denmead
Denmead Junior School, Denmead
Dogmersfield CE Primary School, Dogmersfield
Droxford Junior School, Droxford
Durley CE Primary School,  Durley
East Meon CE Primary School, East Meon
Ecchinswell and Sydmonton CE  Primary School, Ecchinswell
Eling Infant School and Nursery, Eling
Elson Infant School, Gosport
Elson Junior School, Gosport
Elvetham Heath Primary School, Elvetham Heath
Emsworth Primary School, Emsworth
Endeavour Primary School, Andover
Fair Oak Infant School, Fair Oak
Fair Oak Junior School, Fair Oak
Fairfield Infant School, Havant
Fairfields Primary School, Basingstoke
Farnborough Grange Nursery & Infant Community School, Farnborough
Fawley Infant School, Fawley
Fernhill Primary Academy, Farnborough
Fleet Infant School, Fleet
Fordingbridge Infant School, Fordingbridge
Fordingbridge Junior School, Fordingbridge
Four Lanes Community Junior School, Chineham
Four Lanes Infant School, Chineham
Four Marks CE Primary School, Four Marks
Foxhills Infant School, Ashurst
Foxhills Junior School, Ashurst
Freegrounds Infant School, Hedge End
Freegrounds Junior School, Hedge End
Frogmore Infant School, Frogmore
Frogmore Junior School, Frogmore
Front Lawn Primary Academy, Leigh Park
Froxfield CE Primary and Pre-School, Froxfield
Fryern Infant School, Chandler's Ford
Fryern Junior School, Chandler's Ford
Gomer Infant School, Alverstoke
Gomer Junior School, Alverstoke
Grange Community Junior School, Farnborough
Grange Infant School, Rowner
Grange Junior School, Rowner
Grateley Primary School, Grateley
Grayshott CE Primary School, Grayshott
Great Binfields Primary School, Chineham
Greatham Primary School, Greatham
Greenfields Junior School, Hartley Wintney
Guillemont Junior School, Farnborough
Hale Primary School, Hale
Halterworth Primary School, Romsey
Hamble Primary School, Hamble-le-Rice
Hambledon Primary School, Hambledon
Harestock Primary School, Harestock
Harrison Primary School, Fareham
Hart Plain Infant School, Cowplain
Hart Plain Junior School, Cowplain
Haselworth Primary School, Gosport
Hatch Warren Infant School, Basingstoke
Hatch Warren Junior School, Basingstoke
Hawley Primary School, Blackwater
Hazel Wood Infant School, Totton
Heatherside Infant School, Fleet
Heatherside Junior School, Fleet
Herne Junior School Petersfield
Hiltingbury Infant School, Chandler's Ford
Hiltingbury Junior School, Chandler's Ford
Holbrook Primary School, Bridgemary
The Holme CE Primary School, Headley
Hook Infant School, Hook
Hook Junior School, Hook
Hook-with-Warsash CE Academy, Warsash
Hordle CE Primary School, Hordle
Horndean CE Junior School, Horndean
Horndean Infant School, Horndean
Hurstbourne Tarrant CE Primary School, Hurstbourne Tarrant
Hyde CE Primary School, Hyde
Hythe Primary School, Hythe
Itchen Abbas Primary School, Itchen Abbas
John Keble CE Primary School, Hursley
Kempshott Infant School, Kempshott
Kempshott Junior School, Kempshott
Kimpton, Thruxton and Fyfield CE Primary School, Kimpton
Kings Copse Primary School, Hedge End
Kings Furlong Infant and Nursery School Basingstoke
Kings Furlong Junior School Basingstoke
King's Somborne CE Primary School, Stockbridge
Kings Worthy Primary School, Kings Worthy
Kingsclere CE Primary School, Kingsclere
Knight's Enham Junior School, Andover
Knights Enham Nursery and Infant School, Andover
Knightwood Primary School, Chandler's Ford
Langrish Primary School, Stroud
Lee-On-the-Solent Infant and Nursery School, Lee-on-the-Solent
Lee-On-the-Solent Junior School, Lee-on-the-Solent
Leesland CE Infant School, Gosport
Leesland CE Junior School, Gosport
Liphook CE Junior School, Liphook
Liphook Infant School, Liphook
Liss Infant School, Liss
Liss Junior School, Liss
Lockerley CE Primary School, Lockerley
Locks Heath Infant School, Locks Heath
Locks Heath Junior School, Locks Heath
Long Sutton CE Primary School, Long Sutton
Longparish CE  Primary School, Longparish
Lydlynch Infant School, Totton
Lymington CE Infant School, Lymington
Lymington Junior School, Lymington
Manor CE Infant School, Holbury
Manor Field Infant School, Brighton Hill
Manor Field Junior School, Brighton Hill
Manor Infant School, Cove
Manor Junior School, Cove
Marchwood CE Infant School, Marchwood
Marchwood Junior School, Marchwood
Marlborough Infant School, Aldershot
Marnel Community Infant School, Basingstoke
Marnel Junior School, Basingstoke
Mayhill Junior School, Odiham
Medstead CE Primary School, Medstead
Mengham Infant School, Hayling Island
Mengham Junior School, Hayling Island
Meonstoke CE Infant School, Meonstoke
Merdon Junior School, Chandler's Ford
Merton Infant School, Basingstoke
Merton Junior School, Basingstoke
Micheldever CE Primary School, Micheldever
Milford-on-Sea CE Primary School, Milford-on-Sea
Mill Hill Primary School, Waterlooville
Mill Rythe Infant School, Hayling Island
Mill Rythe Junior School, Hayling Island
Morelands Primary School, Purbrook
Netley Abbey Infant School, Netley
Netley Abbey Junior School, Netley
Netley Marsh CE Infant School, Woodlands
New Milton Infant School, New Milton
New Milton Junior School, New Milton
Newlands Primary School, Yateley
Newtown CE Primary School, Gosport
Newtown Soberton Infant School, Soberton
Nightingale Primary School, Eastleigh
North Baddesley Infant School, North Baddesley
North Baddesley Junior School, North Baddesley
North Waltham Primary School, North Waltham
Northern Infant School, Portchester
Northern Junior School, Portchester
Norwood Primary School, Eastleigh
Nursling CE Primary School, Nursling
Oakfield Primary School, Totton
Oakley CE Junior School, Oakley
Oakley Infant School, Oakley
Oakridge Infant School, Basingstoke
Oakridge Junior School, Basingstoke
Oakwood Infant School, Hartley Wintney
Old Basing Infant School, Old Basing
Oliver's Battery Primary School, Oliver's Battery
Orchard Infant School, Dibden Purlieu
Orchard Junior School, Dibden Purlieu
Orchard Lea Infant School, Fareham
Orchard Lea Junior School, Fareham
Otterbourne CE Primary School, Otterbourne
Our Lady and St Joseph RC Primary School, Pennington
Overton CE Primary School, Overton
Owslebury Primary School, Owslebury
Padnell Infant School, Cowplain
Padnell Junior School, Cowplain
Park Gate Primary School, Park Gate
Park Primary School, Aldershot
Park View Primary School, Basingstoke
Parsonage Farm Nursery and Infant School, Farnborough
Peel Common Infant School, Gosport
Peel Common Junior School, Gosport
Pennington CE Junior School, Pennington
Pennington Infant School, Pennington
Petersfield Infant School, Petersfield
Petersgate Infant School, Clanfield
Pilgrims' Cross CE Primary School, Andover
Pinewood Infant School, Farnborough
Portway Infant School, Andover
Portway Junior School, Andover
Potley Hill Primary School, Yateley
Poulner Infant School and Nursery, Poulner
Poulner Junior School, Poulner
Preston Candover CE Primary School, Preston Candover
The Priory Primary School, Tadley
Purbrook Infant School, Purbrook
Purbrook Junior School, Purbrook
Queens Inclosure Primary School, Waterlooville
Ranvilles Infant School, Fareham
Ranvilles Junior School, Fareham
Red Barn Community Primary School, Portchester
Redlands Primary School, Fareham
Riders Infant School, Leigh Park
Riders Junior School, Leigh Park
Ringwood CE Infant School, Ringwood
Ringwood Junior School, Ringwood
Roman Way Primary School, Andover
Romsey Abbey CE Primary School, Romsey
Romsey Primary School, Romsey
Ropley CE Primary School, Ropley
Rowlands Castle St John's CE Primary School, Rowlands Castle
Rowledge CE Primary School, Farnham
Rowner Infant School, Rowner
Rowner Junior, Rowner
Rownhams St John's CE Primary School, Rownhams
Rucstall Primary School, Basingstoke
St Alban's CE Primary School, Havant
St Anne's RC Primary School, South Ham
St Anthony's RC Primary School, Titchfield
St Bede CE Primary School, Winchester
St Bede's RC Primary School, Basingstoke
St Bernadette's RC Primary School, Cove
St Columba CE Primary School, Fareham
St Faith's CE Primary School, Winchester
St Francis CE Primary School, Valley Park
St James' CE Primary School, Emsworth
St James' CE Primary School, West End
St John The Baptist CE Primary School, Titchfield
St John The Baptist CE Primary School, Waltham Chase
St John The Baptist RC Primary School, Andover
St John's CE Primary School, Basingstoke
St John's, Gosport CE Primary School, Gosport
St Joseph's RC Primary School, Aldershot
St Jude's RC Primary School, Fareham
St Lawrence CE Primary School, Alton
St Luke's CE Primary School, Sway
St Mark's CE Primary School, Farnborough
St Mark's CE Primary School, Hatch Warren
St Martin's East Woodhay CE Primary School, East Woodhay
St Mary Bourne Primary School, St Mary Bourne
St Mary's Bentworth CE Primary School, Bentworth
St Mary's CE Junior School, Old Basing
St Mary's RC Primary School, Gosport
St Matthew's CE Primary School, Blackmoor
St Michael and All Angels CE Infant School, Lyndhurst
St Michael's CE Infant School, Aldershot
St Michael's CE Junior School, Aldershot
St Patrick's RC Primary School, Farnborough
St Peter's CE Junior School, Farnborough
St Peter's RC Primary School, Waterlooville
St Peter's RC Primary School, Winchester
St Swithun Wells RC Primary School, Chandler's Ford
St Thomas' CE Infant School, Woolton Hill
St Thomas More's RC Primary School, Bedhampton
Sarisbury CE Junior School Sarisbury Green
Sarisbury Infant School, Sarisbury Green
Scantabout Primary School, Chandler's Ford
Selborne CE Primary School, Selborne
Shakespeare Infant School, Eastleigh
Shakespeare Junior School, Eastleigh
Shamblehurst Primary School, Hedge End
Sharps Copse Primary And Nursery School, Havant
Sheet Primary School, Sheet
Sherborne St John CE Primary School, Sherborne St John
Shipton Bellinger Primary School, Shipton Bellinger
Silchester CE Primary School, Silchester
Smannell And Enham CE Primary School, Smannell
Sopley Primary School, Bransgore
South Baddesley CE Primary School, South Baddesley
South Farnborough Infant School, Farnborough
South Farnborough Junior School, Farnborough
South View Infant and Nursery School, Basingstoke
South View Junior School, Basingstoke
South Wonston Primary School, South Wonston
Southwood Infant School, Southwood
Sparsholt CE Primary School, Sparsholt
Springwood Infant School, Waterlooville
Springwood Junior School, Waterlooville
Stanmore Primary School, Stanmore
Steep CE Primary School, Steep
Stockbridge Primary School, Stockbridge
Stoke Park Infant School, Bishopstoke
Stoke Park Junior School, Bishopstoke
Stoneham Park Academy, North Stoneham
Sun Hill Infant School, New Alresford
Sun Hill Junior School, New Alresford
Swanmore CE Primary School, Swanmore
Tadley Community Primary School, Tadley
Talavera Infant School, Aldershot
Talavera Junior School, Aldershot
Tavistock Infant School, Fleet
Tiptoe Primary School, Tiptoe
Titchfield Primary School, Titchfield
Tower Hill Primary School, Farnborough
Trosnant Infant School, Leigh Park
Trosnant Junior School, Leigh Park
Tweseldown Infant School, Church Crookham
Twyford St Mary's CE Primary School, Twyford
Upham CE Primary School, Upham
Uplands Primary School, Fareham
Velmead Junior School, Fleet
Vernham Dean Gillum's CE Primary School, Vernham Dean
Vigo Primary School, Andover
Wallisdean Infant School, Fareham
Wallisdean Junior School, Fareham
Wallop Primary School, Nether Wallop
Warren Park Primary School, Leigh Park
Waterside Primary School, Hythe
Weeke Primary School, Weeke
Wellington Community Primary School, Aldershot
Wellow School, West Wellow
Wellstead Primary School, Hedge End
West Meon CE Primary School, West Meon
West Tytherley CE Primary School, West Tytherley
Western CE Primary School, Winchester
Western Downland CE Primary School, Rockbourne
Westfields Infant School, Yateley
Westfields Junior School, Yateley
The Westgate School, Winchester
Weyford Nursery and Primary Academy, Bordon
Wherwell Primary School, Wherwell
Whitchurch CE Primary School, Whitchurch
Whiteley Primary School, Whiteley
Whitewater CE Primary School, Rotherwick
Wickham CE Primary School, Wickham
Wicor Primary School, Portchester
Wildground Infant School, Dibden Purlieu
Wildground Junior School, Dibden Purlieu
William Gilpin CE Primary School, Boldre
Winklebury Infant School, Winklebury
Winklebury Junior School, Winklebury
Winnall Primary School, Winnall
Woodcot Primary School, Bridgemary
Woodcroft Primary School, Waterlooville
Woodlea Primary School, Whitehill
Woolton Hill Junior School, Woolton Hill
Wootey Infant School, Alton
Wootey Junior School, Alton

Secondary schools

Alderwood School, Aldershot
Aldworth School, Basingstoke
Amery Hill School, Alton
Applemore College, Dibden Purlieu
The Arnewood School, New Milton
Bay House School, Gosport
Bishop Challoner Catholic Secondary School, Basingstoke
Bohunt School, Liphook
Bridgemary School, Gosport
Brighton Hill Community School, Basingstoke
Brookfield Community School, Sarisbury Green
Brune Park Community School, Gosport
The Burgate School, Fordingbridge
Calthorpe Park School, Fleet
Cams Hill School, Fareham
Clere School, Burghclere
The Costello School, Basingstoke
Court Moor School, Fleet
Cove School, Cove
The Cowplain School, Cowplain
Cranbourne School, Basingstoke
Crestwood Community School, Boyatt Wood
Crofton School, Stubbington
Crookhorn College, Waterlooville
Deer Park School, Hedge End
Eggar's School, Holybourne
Everest Community Academy, Basingstoke
Fareham Academy, Fareham
Fernhill School, Farnborough
Frogmore Community College, Yateley
Hamble School, Hamble-le-Rice
Harrow Way Community School, Andover
Havant Academy, Havant
The Hayling College, Hayling Island
Henry Beaufort School, Harestock
The Henry Cort Community College, Fareham
Horndean Technology College, Waterlooville
Hounsdown School, Totton
The Hurst School, Baughurst
John Hanson Community School, Andover
Kings' School, Winchester
The Mountbatten School, Romsey
New Forest Academy, Holbury
Noadswood School, Dibden Purlieu
Oaklands Catholic School, Waterlooville
Oakmoor School, Bordon
Park Community School, Havant
Perins School, New Alresford
The Petersfield School, Petersfield
Portchester Community School, Portchester
Priestlands School, Pennington
Purbrook Park School, Purbrook
Ringwood School, Ringwood
Robert May's School, Odiham
The Romsey School, Romsey
Swanmore College, Swanmore
Test Valley School, Stockbridge
Testbourne Community School, Whitchurch
Testwood School, Totton
Thornden School, Chandler's Ford
Toynbee School, Chandler's Ford
The Vyne Community School, Basingstoke
Warblington School, Warblington
The Wavell School, Farnborough
The Westgate School, Winchester
Wildern School, Hedge End
Winton Community Academy, Andover
Wyvern College, Fair Oak
Yateley School, Yateley

Special and alternative schools

The Ashwood Academy, Basingstoke
The Austen Academy, Basingstoke
Baycroft School, Stubbington
The Bridge Education Centre, Eastleigh
Coppice Spring Academy, Basingstoke
Dove House School, Basingstoke
The Eaglewood School, New Milton
Forest Park School, Totton
Glenwood School, Emsworth
Greenwood School, Dibden
Heathfield Special School, Fareham
Henry Tyndale School, Farnborough
Hollywater School, Bordon
Icknield School, Andover
The Key Education Centre, Gosport
Lakeside School, Chandler's Ford
Limington House School, Basingstoke
LWS Academy, Sarisbury Green
Maple Ridge School, Basingstoke
The Mark Way School, Andover
Norman Gate School, Andover
Oak Lodge School, Dibden Purlieu
Osborne School, Winchester
Prospect School, Havant
Rachel Madocks School, Cowplain
Riverside Community Special School, Purbrook
Rowhill School, Aldershot
St Francis Special School, Fareham
Samuel Cody Specialist Sports College, Farnborough
Saxon Wood School, Rooksdown
Shepherds Down Special School, Compton
Smannell Field School, Andover
The Waterloo School, Waterlooville
Wolverdene Special School, Andover

Further education

Independent schools

Primary and preparatory schools

 Cheam School, Headley
 Daneshill School, Stratfield Turgis
 Durlston Court School, Barton on Sea
 Farleigh School, Andover
 Forres Sandle Manor School, Fordingbridge
 Grantham Farm Montessori School, Baughurst
 Grey House Preparatory School, Hartley Wintney
 Horris Hill School, Newtown
 Inwoods Small School, Bramdean
 Kingscourt School, Catherington
 Norman Court School, West Tytherley
 The Pilgrims' School, Winchester
 Princes Mead School, Kings Worthy
 St Neot's School, Eversley
 Sherborne House School, Chandler's Ford
 Stroud King Edward VI Preparatory School, Romsey
 Thorngrove School, Highclere
 Twyford School, Twyford
 Walhampton School, Walhampton
 West Hill Park School, Titchfield
 Woodhill Preparatory School, Botley
 Yateley Manor School, Yateley

Senior and all-through schools

 Alton School, Alton
 Ballard School, New Milton
 Bedales School, Steep
 Boundary Oak School, Fareham
 Brockwood Park School, Bramdean
 Churcher's College, Petersfield
 Ditcham Park School, Petersfield
 Embley, Wellow
 Farnborough Hill, Farnborough
 Hurst Lodge School, Blackwater
 The King's School, Fair Oak
 Lord Wandsworth College, Long Sutton
 Meoncross School, Fareham
 Moyles Court School, Ringwood
 New Forest Small School, Lyndhurst
 Rookwood School, Andover
 St Michael's School, Burghclere
 St Nicholas' School, Church Crookham
 St Swithun's School, Winchester
 Salesian College, Farnborough
 Sherfield School, Sherfield on Loddon
 Winchester College, Winchester

Special and alternative schools

Bere Clinic School, Waterlooville
Clay Hill School, Lyndhurst
Compass Community School Hampshire, Medstead
Coxlease School, Lyndhurst
Fair Ways School, Swanwick
GLADE School, Totton
Grateley House School, Grateley
The Green Room School, Kingsley
Hill House School, Boldre
Inclusion School, Basingstoke
Jubilee School, Waterlooville
Kingsgate School, Fareham
The Loddon School, Sherfield on Loddon
New Forest School, Fawley
Releasing Potential School, Havant
St Edward's School, Sherfield English
Southampton Priory Hospital School, Marchwood
Southlands School, Boldre
Tadley Court School, Tadley
Treloar School, Holybourne

External links
List of schools - Hampshire County Council

Hampshire
Lists
Lists of buildings and structures in Hampshire